Anil Shetty (born 25 June 1987) Is an Indian Startup Entrepreneur, Politician and Social Change maker.  Founder of MetaMan, India’s first exclusive men’s jewellery brand along with Bollywood actor Suniel Shetty. Shetty is the State Treasurer of Bharatiya Janata Party Yuva Morchaa in Karnataka. He was named the Top 10 Yuva Kannadiga 2018 by Karnataka’s no 1 daily newspaper Vijayakarnataka.

Early life
Shetty comes from Shanakaranarayana, a small village in Udupi district, Karnataka. A college drop-out from M.S.Ramaiah Institute of Technology, he decided to pursue his dream of becoming an Entrepreneur. Born and brought in a remote village in Karnataka with no access to electricity, toilets, phone or tv. Family held BPL card to meet their needs. Anil went to a kannada medium Govt school and scored ranking percentage in PUC. Came to Bengaluru in 2005 with 75 rupees in hand and enrolled into MS Ramaiah Institute of Technology to do his engineering. He worked in a sweet stall with his uncle as he could not afford his engineering fee.

Entrepreneurial Life 
Anil Shetty dropped out of engineering college at the age of 20 and became an entrepreneur. At the age of 23 he co founded a company in Mumbai which involved Bollywood celebrities Cricketers to Forbes Billionaires called "Fly with VIP" which was launched by Amitabh Bachchan.  He then turned to become an Independent Investment Banker and helped raise funds for many successful startups including Licious, which is now a unicorn startup. He continues to do his investment banking work and gives strategic advice to many companies. Recently, Anil has launched a new fashion startup MetaMan with Actor Suniel Shetty, which raised a million dollar funding from cricketer KL Rahul and many unicorn startup founders.

Social Work and Activism 
Save Govt Schools Movement - Having studied in Kannada medium Govt school Anil Shetty knew how important the quality education is and how it can lift people out of poverty. To help millions of children studying in Govt schools Anil in 2018 started the Save Govt School Movement to demand new state education policy. He and his friends from the film industry redeveloped few Govt schools to increase enrolment. Anil personally contributed towards construction of school building in Govt school. He studied and also built a computer lab. Save Govt School Movement received wide publicity in media too.

Peace Auto - to help thousands of auto drivers with social and economic security and to provide good service to commuters. Started in 2013 Peace Auto is now the largest auto rickshaw union as well as a cooperative society in Bengaluru city.  A day dedicated to auto drivers, 9 November celebrated as Auto Rickshaw Day every year where thousands of auto drivers participate with their family and receive awards for their good work.

B.PAC - Bengaluru Political Action Committee, a policy think tank and political leadership development organisation founded by Biocon Chairman Kiran Mazumdar Shaw and former Infosys Director Mohandas Pai. Anil joined the board of BPAC in 2013 and was part of many policy inputs to Govt.

Namma Heroes Award Show - an annual award show to recognise unsung heroes of our society such as pourakarmikas, scavengers, police constables, fire safety workers and so on.  It’s like a Filmfare award for them held at five star hotels with many prominent people attending.  On 25 June 2021 he celebrated his birthday with Asha workers by giving them cash rewards for their selfless work during covid lockdown. Also contributed funds to Hospital Nurses Welfare Organisation. 

Flex Politics Beda Campaign - a campaign to remove illegal flex banners in bengaluru city which was causing both environmental pollution as well as political pollution. After 1.5 years of relentless effort on ground finally High Court put blanket ban on flex banners. Anil Shetty been credited for fighting this cause on ground. 

Pothole Free Bengaluru Campaign - Anil slept on road for 8 days in 2018 moving one place to another place counting potholes on road and protesting against BBMP.  This campaign was widely covered in media as citizen movement demanding BBMP to fill potholes.

Swachha Bengaluru campaign - Anil and his team have conducted several cleaning drivers to remove black spots for the last many years.

Constitution Preamble Campaign - Anil Shetty started this unique campaign in 2015 to create awareness about Constitution of India and its ideals. Started distributing Preamble to Constitution of India to citizens by printing several copies. Also conducted events inviting speakers to speak on constitution. First time ever in 2016 Dr B R Ambedakr birth anniversary was conducted in UB city to give message that we must not reduce babaaaheb to a community leader rather a role model for every Indian. In fact in 2019 Anil conducted another event where BJP national organising general secretary B L Santhosh spoke on Ambedakr and Constitution.

Project Hope - Whatever it Takes - a coffee table book Anil curated featuring his celebrity friends along with children who are affected by cancer. Through this book he raised funds to buy treatment for cancer patients.

Bengaluru Youth Festival - Anil Shetty chaired Bengaluru Youth Festival in 2016. Event was attended by thousands of young people. It was a platform for young people to display their talent and participate in cultural events. 

BMTC Employees Children Scholarship Program - Rs.10lac scholarship was awarded to children of BMTC bus drivers and conductors under the leadership of Anil Shetty in 2015.

My Vote is not for Sale campaign - during 2018 election Anil started this unique campaign My Vote is not for Sale to create awareness among citizens to not vote by taking money and also give a strong message to political system. His appeal video watched by lacs of people on social media and he also held a massive rally in support of this campaign.

Wire Free Bengaluru - to fight against illegal cables Anil started this campaign and filed several complaints against several people who violated law. Also protested in front of BWSSB and BBMP demanding removal of illegal cables hanging everywhere from trees to buildings. Campaign received huge media support.

Save Bellandur Lake campaign and Right to Water Summit - Anil shetty held protest to save Bellandur lake in 2017 and also hosted  Right to Water Summit to discuss possibility of finding alternative source of water in Bengaluru city which is solely dependent on Cauvery water.

Public Interest Litigations in High Court - Anil filed PIL in High Court of Karnataka against 60 plus corporators who have failed to declare their assets and liabilities and urged the Govt to disqualify them. He also filed another PIL against BBMP for honouring 550 people from dubious and criminal background with prestigious Nadaprabhu Kempegowda award. Anil argued that by not selecting right people to receive this award BBMP has humiliated Kempegowda and demanded rollback of awards. Court had asked Anil to write to Govt to fix this and it resulted in restricting only 100 achievers receiving award in subsequent years saving tax payers money as well as saving legacy of Kempegowda award.

Major work and ongoing projects in BTM Layout constituency 
Covid Relief Activities- First Wave - Direct Cash Benefit Transfer - During the lockdown, we have transferred more than Rs. 20lacs to 1500 families of daily wage workers, anywhere between Rs. 500-2000. This scheme was inspired by Prime Minister Modi’s idea of Direct Cash Benefit Transfer to farmers. Second Wave - 5000 ration kits to poor families, 1,85,000 food packets in 40 days, 40 oxygen concentrators, 200 home isolation kits, 28 tons of vegetables, 735 free vaccine shots given to locals and steam inhaler provided to police stations.

Atal Janata Clinic - mobile primary healthcare centre providing free treatment to poor patients in BTM Layout constituency in all 8 wards. Formally inaugurated on 25 December 2020 as tribute to former prime minister Shri Atal Bihari Vajpayee, so far treated close to 45,000 patients until today and aiming to treat another 25,000 patients this year.  Under this project we have also reimbursed medical bills of many of our people who could not afford hospitalisation and we continue to do so.

Digital Seva Centre - a citizen centre where local residents can enrol into Central and State Govt schemes. Audugodi and BTM Layout ward centres are currently operational. From Ayushmann Bharat card to Pension Scheme enrolment to Voter ID registration our Digital Seva Centres have provided service to more than 5,000 citizens so far.

Bruhat Udyoga Mela - Nava Bengaluru Foundation in association with Sansad Udyoga Mitra ( Bengaluru South MP Tejasvi Surya initiative) conducted a Mega Job Fair to connect job seekers with employers. More than 1500 aspirants applied for various jobs listed by 78 companies. Under the banner of "Livelihood Project" this efforts are continuing.

Seva Karyakarteyaru (Workers ) -Home delivery of Govt schemes through well trained women who identify themselves as Seva Karyakarteyaru ( Workers ). We have appointed 16 Seva workers and aiming to visit every house in BTM Layout Constituency to deliver all central and state Govt schemes. So far Seva Workers have visited more than 35,000 houses.

Sri Vishweshwaraiah Shikshana Nidhi - A scholarship scheme for underprivileged children in BTM constituency. Our focus area is academics, sports and Special Talents. Under this scheme we have provided more than Rs.20 lacs scholarship in this year until now.

Java Sevaka - A mobile unit moving in all wards of BTM Layout constituency to identify civic issues and file complaint with concerned authority and follow up to fix the issues.

Bhagat Singh Sene - a youth organisation in BTM Layout constituency to motivate and inspire young people of constituency to develop themselves and contribute towards nation building. Several programs were conducted under this banner.

Elderly Seva Project - To help senior citizens, who are mostly orphaned or with no family income we started this monthly pension scheme to support their medical and other small expenses. Now 60 elders receive Rs.1000 per month and we hope to reach 100.

Role in Bharatiya Janata Party (BJP) 
Inspired by the ideology of the Bharatiya Janata Party and work of Prime Minister Shri Narendra Modi, Anil Shetty joined BJP in 2020 taking up the responsibility of State Treasurer of Yuva Morchaa.  Anil Shetty is credited for organizing "Nav Bharat Mela " in Koramangala attended by BJP National General Secretary Sri CT Ravi, State President Sri Nalin Kumar Kateel and ministers from state Govt and many other party leaders.

I always believed one must earn living in a rightful way and lead a purposeful life. True concept of "Yukta Vairagya " ( appropriate detachment ) mentioned in Bhagavad Gita - Anil Shetty.

Recognitions 
1. Named as heart of gold by Times of India 2013. 

2. Named as a Yuva Kannadiga of the Year 2019.

Other information 
Anil Shetty was invited by the US Department of State to represent India in a leadership program in America and also part of South Indian delegation to Israel. Anil has delivered more than a thousand plus public talks on various topic and also conducts weekly class based on Bhagavad Gita along with Dr Gururaj Karjagi " Bhagavad Gita for Youth".  

He is named as Heart of Gold by Times of India newspaper and Vijayakarntaka newspaper listed him as " Top 10 Yuva Kannadiga " in 2018. 

Inspired by Bhagavad Gita on Gita Jayanthi (14 December 2021), Anil Shetty signed a pledge to give away 50 percent of his earning in charity during his lifetime and 100 percent on his passing. He initiated Young India Philanthropy Pledge (YIPP ) to inspire more people to sign this pledge to help more people in need.

References

People from Udupi district
1987 births
Living people
Social leaders
Businesspeople from Karnataka